The 2009 Euro Beach Soccer League, was the twelfth edition of the Euro Beach Soccer League (EBSL), the premier beach soccer competition contested between European men's national teams, occurring annually since its establishment in 1998. The league was organised by Beach Soccer Worldwide (BSWW) between July 10 and August 23, 2009.

In 2009, BSWW introduced major changes to the EBSL. This included the reintroduction of Divisions A and B to the league, and making the Superfinal a Division A only event; the opportunity for Division B teams to qualify for the Superfinal was replaced with having the nations of the second division aim to qualify for a new additional post season event instead, the Promotion Final, in which nations would compete to try and earn promotion to Division A, as well as other changes explained later.

Portugal were the defending champions but fell short in the championship match of the Superfinal, losing to Russia who claimed their first European title. Meanwhile, in Division B, Romania were promoted after winning the inaugural edition of the Promotion Final, with Norway relegated from Division A in return.

Format changes 
2009 saw the introduction of major changes to the format of this and future seasons of the EBSL which have remained almost unchanged to date (2017). The following decisions were made:

Restructure of stages and divisions 
 The concept of Divisions A and B were reintroduced after they were scrapped in 2008.
 Division A and B fixtures will take place simultaneously throughout the regular season (rather than teams in Division B starting and completing all of their scheduled fixtures before the nations of Division A even begin their season as was the case in 2006 and 2007).
 Between 2002 and 2007, Divisions A and B hosted their own stages separately, taking place in different locations and during different dates. This format was discarded. It was decided from now on, each stage that is organised will host both Division A and Division B fixtures together, in the same place and during the same dates.
 Historically, each season BSWW allocated teams to Division A and B at the start each season, with teams often being moved back and forth between divisions, year on year, without going through an official promotion or relegation process. It was decided the same nations would now take part in each division season after season (barring promoted and relegated teams as explained below).

Introduction of the Promotion Final 
 Teams in Division A will compete to earn enough points for the regular season league table to qualify for the Superfinal season-finale event in which the league title is then to be contested directly (just as has been the Superfinal's purpose since its introduction to the EBSL in 2001).
 Unlike Division B's last incarnation between 2002 and 2007, from now on, teams from Division B can no longer qualify for the Superfinal – the Superfinal is now exclusively for Division A teams.
 Teams in Division B will now compete to earn enough points for the regular season league table to qualify for a new postseason event – the Promotion Final.
 The Division B team which wins the Promotion Final will be promoted into Division A the following season (except for in the scenario below).
 The team bottom of the Division A regular season table will also take part in the Promotion Final to try and defend their place. If they win the event, they will retain their Division A status for the next season and so no Division B team will be promoted that year.

Schedule

Teams

Stage 1 (Lignano Sabbiadoro, 10–12 July)

Division A

Division B

Stage 2 (Minehead, 17–19 July)

Division A 

Norway are ranked ahead of France based on their head-to-head result

Division B

Stage 3 (Béziers, 29–31 July)

Division A

Division B

Stage 4 (Ostia, 11–13 August)

Division A

Tables

Division A

Division B

Promotion Final (Vila Real de Santo António, 20–23 August)

Teams 
 
 
 
  – worst ranked in Division A (attempting to defend their place)
 
  – received a bye straight into the Promotion Final

Group stage

Group A

Group B

Placement stage

Fifth place play-off

Third place play-off

Final

Final standings

Superfinal (Vila Real de Santo António, 20–23 August)

Teams

Group stage

Group A

Group B

Placement stage

Fifth place play-off

Third place play-off

Final

Awards

Final standings

Sources 

 Roonba
 BSWW
 beachsoccer.ru (in Russian)
 beachsoccerrussia.ru (in Russian)

Euro Beach Soccer League
2009 in beach soccer